Cerro Echandi is a mountain in Bocas del Toro Province of western Panama and in Limón of southwest Costa Rica, on the border with Costa Rica.

References

Mountains of Panama
Mountains of Costa Rica
Costa Rica–Panama border
International mountains of North America